A general election was held in the U.S. state of South Carolina on November 6, 2018. All of South Carolina's executive officers were up for election as well as all of South Carolina's seven seats in the United States House of Representatives.

Governor and Lieutenant Governor

Beginning with the 2018 gubernatorial election, the offices of governor and lieutenant governor were elected jointly as a ticket instead of being elected separately as in prior years.

Former incumbent Republican Governor Nikki Haley was term-limited and could not run for re-election to a third consecutive term.  Haley was selected as United States Ambassador to the United Nations in the Donald Trump administration.  Haley's nomination was confirmed. Former Lieutenant Governor Henry McMaster became governor on January 24, 2017, for the remainder of the term.

Attorney General
Incumbent Republican Attorney General Alan Wilson  ran for re-election to a third term.

Other Republican candidates included State Representative Todd Atwater, like Wilson, from Lexington  and Greenville attorney William Herlong.

Potential Democratic candidates include 1st Circuit Solicitor David Pascoe.

Secretary of State
Incumbent Republican Secretary of State Mark Hammond ran for re-election to a fifth term in office.

State Representative Joshua Putnam is challenged Hammond for the Republican nomination.

Governing magazine had projected the race as "safe Republican".

Treasurer

Incumbent Republican Treasurer Curtis M. Loftis, Jr. ran for re-election to a third term in office.

Comptroller General

Incumbent Republican Richard Eckstrom won re-election to a fifth term in office.

Superintendent of Education

Incumbent Republican Superintendent of Education Molly Spearman ran for re-election to a second term.

Commissioner of Agriculture

Incumbent Republican Commissioner of Agriculture Hugh Weathers, who was appointed to the position in September 2004, ran for re-election to a fourth full term in office.

United States House of Representatives

All of South Carolina's seven seats in the United States House of Representatives were up for election in 2018.

South Carolina State House of Representatives

All 124 seats in the South Carolina House of Representatives were up for election in 2018. On election day 2018, Republicans controlled 80 seats as compared to the Democrats' 44. Although four seats flipped party, there was no net change in the composition of the state House because Republicans flipped Districts 42 and 97 while Democrats flipped Districts 15 and 117. Republicans maintained their 80-to-44 seat majority in the South Carolina House following the 2018 election.

References

External links
Candidates at Vote Smart 
Candidates at Ballotpedia
Campaign finance at OpenSecrets

Official Attorney General campaign websites
Constance Anastopoulo (D) for Attorney General
Alan Wilson (R) for Attorney General

Official Secretary of State campaign websites
Mark Hammond (R) for Secretary of State
Melvin Whittenburg (D) for Secretary of State

Official State Treasurer campaign websites
Rosalyn Glenn (D) for Treasurer
Curtis Loftis (R) for Treasurer
Sarah Work (I) for Treasurer

Official Superintendent of Education campaign websites
Molly Spearman (R) for Superintendent

Official Commissioner of Agriculture campaign websites
Hugh Weathers (R) for Agriculture Commissioner

 
South Carolina